MZKT-79221 is a Soviet and Russian army 16x16 transporter-erector-launcher designed and developed by the MZKT in Belarus.

Developed primarily for use as a RT-2PM2 Topol-M ICBM mobile launcher, the 79221 model is similar to the MAZ-7917 but has eight axles instead of seven.  It is powered by a YaMZ-847.1 (800 horse power) V12 diesel engine.

See also 

MAZ-7310
KAMAZ-7850

References

Military vehicles of Russia
Self-propelled rocket launchers
Missile launchers
Military vehicles of Belarus